The judiciary of the Philippines consists of the Supreme Court, which is established in the Constitution, and three levels of lower courts, which are established through law by the Congress of the Philippines. The Supreme Court has expansive powers, able to overrule political and administrative decisions, and with the ability to craft rules and law without precedent. It further determines the rules of procedure for lower courts, and its members sit on electoral tribunals.

Below the Supreme Court is the Court of Appeals, which also has national scope with different divisions based in different regions of the country. Decisions from this court can only be appealed to the Supreme Court. Below this level are Regional Trial Courts, which are spread throughout the country among judicial regions. Some of these courts are specialized to deal with certain types of cases. Below these courts are the first level Metropolitan and Municipal Trial Courts, which are located in cities and municipalities throughout the country.

Outside of the regular court systems, special courts have been set up to deal with particular cases. These include the Court of Tax Appeals and the Sandiganbayan, which are considered equivalent to the Court of Appeals. In some parts of the country, Sharia courts have been established. Outside of the court system, a number of quasi-judicial bodies have some powers established via law.

The Supreme Court was given its expansive powers following a period of martial law, where the Executive dominated. While the Judiciary oversees the other branches of government, judges are appointed to the Judiciary by the President of the Philippines from a shortlist submitted by the Judicial and Bar Council, a body the President can influence.

Hierarchy of Courts

Supreme Court

The Supreme Court (SC) is the highest court of the land and is the court of last resort.  It is led by the Chief Justice, who is joined by 14 Associate Justices. The court has expansive powers and a constitutional responsibility to oversee other branches of government, able even to overrule the discretion of political and administrative individuals and bodies. This power is a response to a previous period of martial law during which the courts often declined to act against the Executive. These powers also gave the courts rule-making abilities more typically associated with legislatures.

The 1987 constitution gives the Supreme Court "original jurisdiction on cases affecting ambassadors, other public ministers and consuls, and over petitions for certiorari, prohibition, mandamus, quo warranto, and habeas corpus". It is the appellate court for cases where "the constitutionality or validity of any treaty, international or executive agreement, law, presidential decree, proclamation, order, instruction, ordinance, or regulation is in question", for the "legality of any tax" and related matters, where the "jurisdiction of any lower court is in issue", "criminal cases where the penalty is reclusión perpetua or higher", and "in which only an error or question of law is involved". Appeals from lower courts are taken on certiorari. Appellate jurisdiction over various matters can be increased by the Philippine Congress in agreement with the court.

The court's powers allow it to create new law without requiring precedent, and on which its decision is final. The Oposa v. Factoran case, centered on environmental protection, saw the court recognize the rights of future generations. Writs of amparo and habeas data were approved in 2007, to better enable courts to deal with extrajudicial killings and disappearances. In 2008 it rewrote libel guidelines, reducing penalties. Environmental protections were further enhanced through the approval of the writ of kalikasan in 2010, which provided protections against extreme environmental damage. Both of these writs came with a provision that removed filing fees. The 2010 rules of procedure for environmental cases established by the Supreme Court were a first for any country. In 2015 the court recognized the standing of cetaceans, including "toothed whales, dolphins, [and] porpoises", who while lacking independent legal personality could be represented by Philippine citizens, in a case regarding oil exploration in the Tañon Strait. The decision came following a case lasting eight years, ending long after the oil exploration had already ceased.

The Supreme Court is the only court established through the constitution, with all lower courts being established through legislation. It makes up the fourth and highest level of court, with lower courts on the same level unable to review the decisions of courts at the same level. The rules governing the proceedings in the lower courts are determined by the Supreme Court.

Regular courts
In addition to the Supreme Court, there are three lower levels of regular courts. This structure is hierarchical. Second and First-level courts are organized geographically, although this is purely an administrative arrangement.

Third-level courts

The Court of Appeals (CA) is the appellate court for civil and criminal cases not involving actions related to governing the country, and has original jurisdiction on issuance of writs of mandamus, prohibition, injunction, certiorari, habeas corpus and other auxiliary writs. The court is composed of 68 associate justices headed by a presiding justice. These are divided into 23 divisions of 3 members, 17 of which are based in Manila and hear cases from Luzon, 3 of which are based in Cebu City and hear cases from the Visayas, and 3 which are based in Cagayan de Oro and hear cases from Mindanao. The court shares some concurrent original jurisdiction with the Supreme Court. It is the second highest court, and decisions reached by this court can only be appealed to the Supreme Court on questions of law.

Second-level courts

A Regional Trial Court (RTC) has original jurisdiction on criminal matters, except on those where the Sandiganbayan has original jurisdiction on, and for certain civil suits. Multiple branches of regional trial courts can be established in the same judicial region. Each branch, as in all second and first level courts, is led by a single judge. Some RTC branches are directed to focus exclusively on certain types of cases.

First-level courts
First-level courts have original jurisdiction on criminal matters, except on those where the Sandiganbayan and Regional Trial Courts have original jurisdiction on, on violations of city or municipal ordinances, on certain civil cases, and on cases involving forcible entry. Each court has one judge. A party may appeal to a Regional Trial Court.

The following are the first level courts:
Metropolitan Trial Courts (MeTC) are first level courts in Metro Manila
Municipal Trial Courts (MTC) are first level courts in each municipality
Municipal Trial Courts in Cities are first level courts in each city outside Metro Manila
Municipal Circuit Trial Courts (MCTC) are first level courts in two or more municipalities

Special courts
Some courts have been created by law to deal with specific types of cases, with their rulings restricted to this specific jurisdiction.

Specialized regional courts
Some regional courts are specifically assigned to handle certain types of cases with their relevant geographical area. Some are designated as a "Family Court", with jurisdiction over cases involving children. Others have been designated "Heinous Crime Courts", dealing with cases involving kidnapping, certain forms of robbery, drug crimes, intellectual property rights, and libel. In 2008 some were designated to deal with environmental cases.

Court of Tax Appeals

The Court of Tax Appeals (CTA) both has original jurisdiction and is an appellate court for matters related to taxes. The court is led by a presiding justice, and has eight associate justices. It is an appellate court, equal to the Court of Appeals.

Sandiganbayan

The Sandiganbayan is a special court set up to deal with instances of corruption involving a government official or an official in a government-owned body. It also has jurisdiction over other crimes committed by public officials, if these felonies relate to their office. The court is led by a presiding justice, and with the presiding justice, is composed of 14 associate justices. It is considered equal to the Court of Appeals. The Sandiganbayan was originally established as the Tanodbayan under the 1973 constitution.

Cases are filed at the Sandibanbayan by the Ombudsman. The Ombudsman is tasked with investigation official corruption, and can prosecute all public officials and agencies aside from the President, who is immune from such prosecution while in office. The Ombudsman and their deputies are selected by the President from a list provided by the Judicial and Bar Council, with the Ombudsman requiring ten years of experience as a judge or lawyer. The President has no ability to appoint individuals from outside of this list. These appointments do not require confirmation from the legislature. Terms of office last seven years, and an Ombudsman cannot be reappointed.

Sharia Courts 

Sharia District Courts (ShDC), which rule on Sharia law, have limited jurisdiction over cases relating to Muslims. They also have limited territorial jurisdiction, which is determined by the Supreme Court. They are present only in five judicial regions, all areas of Southwest Mindanao. They are equivalent to regional trial courts, and were established under the "Code of Muslim Personal Laws of the Philippines" (Presidential Decree No. 1083) to handle personal relations between Muslims. Sharia courts have original jurisdiction over a number of issues relating to Sharia. They also have concurrent jurisdiction over some matters that fall within the jurisdiction of civil courts, but only where all parties are Muslims. One exception is that cases can be filed in Sharia courts by non-Muslim women married to a Muslim man through Islamic rites. Sharia Circuit Courts (ShCC) have the same rank as Municipal Circuit Trial Courts Sharia District Courts are theoretically overseen by a Sharia Appellate Court, but it has not been established, leaving their decisions instead reviewed by the Supreme Court.

Military courts
Cases involving the military are handled by civil courts, except when the offense is determined to be service-oriented by a civil court. In that case, it shall be tried by court-martial. Under martial law, military courts may try civilians if no civilian courts are functional.

Quasi-judicial bodies 
A quasi-judicial body can adjudicate on matters of law, but only through existing legal basis. They have no actual judicial power. These include:

 Agricultural Inventions Board
 Board of Investments
 Bureau of Patents, Trademarks and Technology Transfer
 Central Board of Assessment Appeal
 Civil Aeronautics Board
 Civil Service Commission
 Commission on Audit
 Commission on Elections
 Construction Industry Arbitration Commission
 Department of Agrarian Reform
 Employees Compensation Commission
 Energy Regulatory Board
 Government Service Insurance System
 Insurance Commission
 Land Registration Authority
 National Electrification Administration
 National Labor Relations Commission
 National Police Commission
 National Telecommunications Commission
 Office of the President
 Philippine Atomic Energy Commission
 Securities and Exchange Commission
 Social Security Commission
 Tariff Commission

The decisions of these bodies are appealed to an appellate court.

Electoral tribunals 
There are electoral tribunals for the presidency and Congress. The Presidential Electoral Tribunal is composed of the Supreme Court. The Senate Electoral Tribunal is composed of three associate justices of the Supreme Court, and six senators. The House of Representatives Electoral Tribunal is composed of three associate justices of the Supreme Court, and six representatives. The composition of the six representatives from both houses should reflect the proportional distribution of political parties in Congress.

Independence

The Judiciary is a co-equal branch of Government to the Executive and the Legislature. Under the 1987 constitution, Judicial terms of office are out of sync with other offices such as the President of the Philippines, to promote independence. The President appoints individuals to the judiciary. Appointments to the judiciary are recommended by the Judicial and Bar Council (JBC) to the President. For the Supreme Court, the President is required to select justices from a shortlist prepared by the JBC, which must include at least three people. However, there have been instances where the President has rejected a shortlist entirely and requested a new one. The JBC was created to further separate the judiciary from political influence, with judges previously being approved by Congress. However, the President has direct influence in the JBC, and can appoint half of its members. Political pressure has also been observed in court decisions, causing inconsistency between different cases.

The constitution prevents the President from appointing individuals in the last two months of their term, however a 2010 Supreme Court ruling established that this prohibition did not apply to judicial appointments, overturning previous court rulings under which the prohibition did apply. This majority for this ruling consisted of appointees of President Gloria Macapagal Arroyo, whose unusually long term in office undermined some of the constitutional guards against undue Presidential influence in other branches of government. The next Chief Justice, Renato Corona, was appointed following this ruling, an appointment which also broke with the traditional precedent whereby the most senior associate justice became the next Chief Justice, which had been in place since the end of martial law. Corona was not recognized by subsequent President Benigno Aquino III, although his executive order cancelling the late appointments justified by the 2010 Supreme Court ruling was reversed by the Supreme Court. Aquino subsequently bypassed seniority in other judicial appointments. Judges must retire at age 70.

There is also some legislative oversight of the judicial system, with the legislature able to carry out impeachment proceedings. The first attempt to impeach a Chief Justice, in 2003, was quashed by the Supreme Court. Corona was impeached in 2012, the first time a Chief Justice had been impeached in Philippine history. His successor, Maria Lourdes Sereno, also had impeachment proceedings brought against her. However, she was removed from office through quo warranto proceedings, before any impeachment proceedings took place.

The Office of the Solicitor General is an independent body that represents the government in legal cases.

References

External links
 
 
 
 
 
 
 

 
Law of the Philippines